Life as We Know It is an American teen drama television series which aired on the ABC network during the 2004–2005 season. It was created by Gabe Sachs and Jeff Judah. The series was loosely based on the novel Doing It by British writer Melvin Burgess.

Premise
Set at the fictional Woodrow Wilson High School in Seattle, Washington, Life as We Know It focuses on three teenage best friends–Dino Whitman, Ben Connor, and Jonathan Fields. Dino is a star ice hockey player whose parents' marriage falls apart when his mother has an affair with his hockey coach. Dino has an uneasy relationship with his girlfriend, Jackie Bradford, a soccer player. Jackie's best friend is Sue Miller, an academic star. Ben becomes interested in Sue, who is unaware he was involved in an affair with a teacher, Monica Young. Jonathan, a clumsy jokester, is teased by Dino for his attraction to the overweight Deborah Tynan.

As part of the show's narrative structure, characters broke the fourth wall by stepping out of the scene — of which the action proceeds behind them in slow motion — and directly addressing the camera.

Characters

Regular
 Sean Faris as Dino Whitman, lead character and star hockey player
 Jon Foster as Ben Connor, one of Dino's best friends who has a rocky relationship with Sue after his affair with Monica Young
 Chris Lowell as Jonathan Fields, Dino's other best friend who goes out with Jackie's friend Deborah
 Missy Peregrym as Jackie Bradford, Dino's on-and-off girlfriend and the best friend of Sue and Deborah
 Jessica Lucas as Sue Miller, as Ben's on-and-off girlfriend who is best friends with Jackie and Deborah
 Kelly Osbourne as Deborah Tynan, Jonathan's witty British friend turned girlfriend and friend of Jackie and Sue
 Lisa Darr as Annie Whitman, Dino's mother who has an affair with Dino's hockey coach
 D. B. Sweeney as Michael Whitman, Dino's father who leaves his wife after her infidelity with Dino's hockey coach
 Marguerite Moreau as Monica Young, a teacher who has an affair with Ben, one of her students. Sue eventually found out and told her father, who convinced Monica to transfer or she would go to jail

Recurring
 Evan Smith as Max Whitman, Dino's younger brother
 Sarah Strange as Mia Tynan, Deborah's mother
 Martin Cummins as Coach Dave Scott, Dino's coach who has an affair with Dino's mother Annie
 Jessica Harmon as Zoe

Guest stars

 Michaela Mann as Emma
 Samantha McLeod as Marissa Becker
 Nick Lashaway as Christopher "Topher" Flynn
 Craig Ferguson as Oliver Davies, Deborah Tynan's dad
 Meghan Ory as Greta
 Amanda Crew as Polly Brewer
 Crystal Lowe as Julie
 Josh Meyers as Sam Connor
 Peter Dinklage as Dr. Belber
 Natasha Melnick as Sabrina
 Connie Britton as Dianne
 Samm Levine as Bernard
 Busy Philipps as Alex

Production 
The series was created by Jeff Judah and Gabe Sachs, who had previously worked on Freaks and Geeks and Undeclared. ABC greenlit a full series order for the fall season in June 2004. The show was filmed in Vancouver, British Columbia and Seattle, Washington by Sachs-Judah Productions and (ca)bloom!, in association with Touchstone Television, a corporate sibling of ABC, both owned by The Walt Disney Company. The school used for exterior shots, possibly interior as well, is Point Grey Secondary School in Vancouver.

Broadcast 
The show premiered on October 7, 2004 in the Thursday 9 p.m. time slot, airing at the same time as NBC's The Apprentice and CBS's CSI: Crime Scene Investigation.

Episodes

Reception
On review aggregator website Rotten Tomatoes, the series has a rating of 73% based on 22 reviews. The consensus states, “Life as We Know It might be too risqué for some viewers, but the teen drama tackles relationships in a nuanced manner.”

Variety called it "a sly, sweet look at high school . . . so good that you immediately make room on your shelf for the cult-fave DVD because you know this is the kind of show that gets cancelled after five episodes." Writing for Entertainment Weekly, Gillian Flynn also gave a positive review and said the show "revels in off-putting frankness."

John Doyle of The Globe and Mail wrote, "Most TV dramas about teenage life either paint everything in a romantic mist or present the teens as near-savages, existing in the sort of hormone-crazed universe depicted in the American Pie movies. Life as we know it falls somewhere in between. The kids are neither precocious nor too crude. They're self-infatuated, but the realities of the world are revealed to them. This is a coming-of-age drama but it's about formative experiences and not merely adolescent high jinks."

Samantha Bornemann of PopMatters noted that while some of the plot lines verged on predictability, with the Miss Young storyline in particular bringing "the series perilously close to camp", the show "is best during...little moments of communication and revelation [between its characters], allowing the teens to show their instinctual decency even as they prove exceedingly fallible human beings."

The media watchdog group the Parents Television Council protested against Life as We Know It saying that the October 2004 episode was sexually charged.

Cancellation
Life as We Know It was pulled from ABC's lineup during November sweeps, but was rerun on MTV to good ratings in November and December 2004. It was ultimately cancelled by ABC in January 2005, with its final two episodes going unaired. In 2005, the series was released on DVD, which included the two previously unaired episodes. Life aired abroad after its American cancellation.

In Brazil the show aired on Sony Entertainment Television starting June 13, 2005 at 7:00pm Tuesdays. In New Zealand, the show premiered in December 2005 on TV2, scheduled against America's Next Top Model. It replaced Veronica Mars, another American import, but was rescheduled after four episodes because of poor ratings. The remaining episodes were rescheduled from their prime-time slot (7:30pm Friday) to midnight Saturday, then pushed back after midnight as the season progressed. The final two episodes were played in reverse order. TV2 repeated the series from the beginning during the third quarter of 2006, just after midnight Thursdays, but again played the final two episodes in reverse order.

Life was also shown in the Philippines in the free cable channel Studio 23. While there were reruns after the initial showing, the two DVD episodes weren't released. In Portugal it is shown on SIC Radical cable channel and is popular among teenagers and young adults. In Hong Kong, it is shown on TVB Pearl and in Asia, it is shown on STAR World.

Life was also shown in South Africa on M-Net (DStv Channel 101), a subscription funded channel. The show was broadcast in prime-time and was popular. When the series 'ran out', M-Net received a large number of complaints from subscribers on their internet forums. Subsequently, the show was replayed in an 11:00am morning slot in early 2006. Life was also broadcast in 2005 on the M-Net Series channel (DStv Channel 104), a channel which is part of the DStv offering. This channel is broadcast via satellite to sub-Saharan Africa.

Life showed in Sweden on Kanal 5 during autumn and winter 2006.

In December 2006 (the beginning of the summer non-ratings period), the show began airing in Australia on the Seven Network at 10:30pm Tuesday nights. The show was also sold to FOX8, where it screened at 7:30pm Saturdays. In Ireland RTE2 showed two episodes every Monday (approximately 2:30am) from mid-January 2007. In Norway the show started airing in August 2006, but was cancelled after eight episodes

It was also broadcast in India in the 2007 fall season on the subscription channel Star World, where it ran all the episodes except the two bonus DVD ones. It is being rerun in India in the same channel in the 5:30–6:30 time slot.

Life was broadcast from January to March 2005 on Living TV in the UK. The series was later rerun on Living's sister channel Trouble.

Home media
Walt Disney Studios Home Entertainment (formerly Buena Vista Home Entertainment) released the complete series on DVD in Region 1 on August 23, 2005. It included all 13 episodes, 2 of which were unaired, on 3 discs. Bonus features included audio commentaries, deleted scenes, outtakes, and the producer's photo gallery.

References

External links
 
 
 Life As We Know It soundtrack

2000s American high school television series
2000s American sex comedy television series
2000s American teen drama television series
2004 American television series debuts
2005 American television series endings
American Broadcasting Company original programming
English-language television shows
Television series about teenagers
Television series by ABC Studios
Television shows set in Seattle
Television shows filmed in Vancouver
Coming-of-age television shows